Flint is an unincorporated community in Yakima County, Washington, United States, located approximately three miles east of Wapato.

The town was named in honor of Isaac Alvinza Flint (founding elder of a church in Yakima city) by the North Yakima and Valley Railway Company.

References

Northern Pacific Railway
Unincorporated communities in Yakima County, Washington
Unincorporated communities in Washington (state)